Hakea ednieana, commonly known as Flinders Range hakea or yandena, is a shrub of the Proteacea  family native to arid parts of central Australia.

Description
It produces white flowers from September to December. The fruit are in clusters, occasionally with soft hairs or smooth, ending with a long beak and inconspicuous horns.

Taxonomy and naming
Hakea ednieana  was first formally described by Ralph Tate in 1885 and published in Transactions, proceedings and report, Royal Society of South Australia.
The specific epithet (ednieana) honours John Ednie Brown who was once the Conservator of Forests in South Australia.

Distribution and habitat
Flinders Range hakea is endemic to an area in western New South Wales and the Flinders Ranges and Far North of South Australia. The plant is often situated on and around rocky cliff faces and along water courses in stony or sandy soils. It is common in South Australia but rare in New South Wales.

References

ednieana
Flora of New South Wales
Flora of South Australia
Plants described in 1885